The Jerky Tapes is the sixth comedy album by prank call artists, the Jerky Boys.  The album was released in 2001, and is the first Jerky Boys album to be released by the independent Laugh.com record label.

The Jerky Tapes is also the final Jerky Boys album with Kamal Ahmed, as the duo broke up prior to the release of this album.

Track listing

References

2001 albums
The Jerky Boys albums
2000s comedy albums